Habronema is a genus of nematodes in the order Spirurida.

Species include:
Habronema clarkirodent parasite
Habronema incertumbird parasite
Habronema microstomaparasite of the stomach of horses, can be transmitted by the stable fly
Habronema muscaeparasite of the stomach of horses

References 

Spirurida
Secernentea genera